Carin Runeson (born 1947), is a Swedish social democratic politician who was a member of the Riksdag from 2006 to 2014.

External links
Carin Runeson at the Riksdag website

1947 births
Living people
Members of the Riksdag from the Social Democrats
Women members of the Riksdag
21st-century Swedish women politicians
Members of the Riksdag 2006–2010
Members of the Riksdag 2010–2014